Ghar Mein Ram Gali Mein Shyam is a 1988 Indian Hindi-language film. It is a remake of the Telugu film Intlo Ramayya Veedhilo Krishnayya.

Plot

Cast
 Govinda as Amar
 Neelam as Jaya Srivastav
 Anupam Kher as Dharamchand
 Johnny Lever as Srivastav's servant
 Satish Shah as Mr. Srivastav
 Rita Bhaduri as Mrs. Dharamchand

Music
Music composed by Amar-Utpal

External links

References

1980s Hindi-language films
1988 films
Hindi remakes of Telugu films